Khötöl  is a town, the center of the Saikhan sum (district) of Selenge Province in northern Mongolia. The cement production plant is in the town.

Populated places in Mongolia